Stephen Latcha (born 29 December 1989) is a Guyanese cricketer. He played in three List A matches for Guyana in 2011.

See also
 List of Guyanese representative cricketers

References

External links
 

1989 births
Living people
Guyanese cricketers
Guyana cricketers